The 2015 Charlotte mayoral election took place on November 3, 2015, to elect the Mayor of Charlotte, North Carolina. Mayoral elections in Charlotte are biennial, with the winner being sworn-in in December.

Primary elections were held on September 15, 2015, with primary runoffs held on October 6 since no candidate takes more than 40% of the vote.

Incumbent Democratic Party Mayor Dan Clodfelter has been in office since April 2014. He was appointed by the Charlotte City Council after Mayor Patrick Cannon, who was elected in 2013, resigned in March 2014 after being arrested for corruption. Cannon was later convicted and sentenced to 44 months in prison.

In December 2014, Clodfelter filed to run in the 2015 election. He lost the Democratic primary in a runoff to Jennifer Roberts, who went on to win the general election.

Democratic primary

Candidates

Declared
Michael Barnes, Charlotte City Councilmember, Mayor Pro Tem and former acting Mayor
Dan Clodfelter, incumbent Mayor
Roderick Davis
David Howard, Charlotte City Councilmember
DeJawon Joseph 
Jennifer Roberts, former Mecklenburg County Commissioner and nominee for North Carolina's 9th congressional district in 2012

Results

Round One

Roberts won the Sept. 15 primary but she did not receive 40 percent of the vote, and in such cases, North Carolina law allows for a "second primary," or runoff, between the top two vote-getters. The runner-up, Clodfelter, requested a runoff which will was held on October 6th.

Round Two

Republican primary

Candidates

Declared
Scott Stone, businessman and nominee for Mayor in 2011
Edwin Peacock III, former Charlotte City Councilmember and nominee for Mayor  in 2013 announced he would be running on May 19.

Results

General election

See also
United States elections, 2015

References

External links
Official campaign websites
Michael Barnes
David Howard
Jennifer Roberts
Scott Stone
Edwin Peacock III
Roderick Davis

2015
Charlotte mayoral
Charlotte